Stane Street Halt railway station was a station serving the community of Takeley Street to the west of the village of Takeley near Bishop's Stortford, England.

The halt opened on 18 December 1922 and closed on 3 March 1952. It was named after the nearby Roman road.

The halt along with almost all the intermediate stations on the Bishop's Stortford–Braintree branch were little used. The halt was built in a rural area. The village centre of Takeley is still rural and Stane Street and Takeley stations were very close together. However to try to boost passenger numbers, the owner of the line introduced a bus service. However the hoped for passenger numbers never materialized. The Halt makes its sole appearance in printed literature in 1935 in S P B Mais's England's Pleasance p. 261.

It closed to passengers along with the rest of the branch.

References

Further reading

External links
 Stane Street Halt station on navigable 1946 O. S. map

 

Disused railway stations in Essex
Former Great Eastern Railway stations
Railway stations in Great Britain opened in 1922
Railway stations in Great Britain closed in 1952